Leviathan: The Last Day of the Decade is an episodic adventure game developed and published by the Russian game studio Lostwood Games for the Microsoft Windows, Mac OS, iOS, and Android platforms. The game includes five episodes, all available both in Russian and English, and by January 2016, four had been released in German

Gameplay 
The player reads through the story and makes decisions at certain points. The player has a variety of actions they can take during game play; these actions include befriending characters, collecting items, and traveling to different places. The player can buy items to unlock new options. Solving puzzles will progress the player through the story line. The player decides to take good or evil actions. Those actions will influence game play and lead to different endings.

Plot 
The setting of Leviathan takes place in a dark fantasy world mixed with cyberpunk and alien technologies. The country is ravaged by a disease called "Decade", which is caused by the Plague King. The "Decade" afflicts the land at irregular intervals and lasts for 10 years. Oliver Vertran, the protagonist and main character, was a young boy when the "Decade" began. When his mother is murdered, he becomes the adopted son of her murderer. Oliver and his friends Kael and Darina, with the help of a Vargoille called Edna, seek to punish a guardian for killing his mother.

Episodes

Development and release 
Lostwood Games started to develop the game in 2012. Andrey Kniazev, the leader of the Russian team that created the game, spent $150,000 to develop Leviathan. Due to the themes of homosexuality and the current state of LGBT rights in Russia, the team initially had a hard time finding a publisher. However, they did find a publisher for the Nintendo 3DS and PlayStation Vita versions, but  they lacked the money to make a port. The game features an opening song, composed by Gleb Kolyadin and Mikhail Kotov, and performed by Nikita Valamin and Maryana Semkina. The original Russian game has been translated into English and German. The German translations of the first two episodes were released in August 2013. In May 2014, they launched a crowdfunding project on Indiegogo to fund the final episode. Funding failed with the game only receiving $195 of the $49,500 goal. Nonetheless, the still want to create the last episode and finish the translations for episode 4 and 5. The game was released on Steam on November 11, 2014. In November 2015, they launched another crowdfunding project on Indiegogo with a goal of $2,000 in order to finish the English translation of the last episode. Funding failed again with the game only receiving $429.

Reception

Sequel 

In October 2015, the developers announced Leviathan: The Cargo, which continues the story set in the world of Leviathan. The visual novel game features characters from Leviathan: The Last Day of the Decade and new ones. The game is set to be released in 2016.

References

External links 
 
 

2013 video games
Adventure games
Android (operating system) games
Cyberpunk video games
Dark fantasy video games
Episodic video games
IOS games
LGBT-related video games
MacOS games
Video games developed in Russia
Video games with alternate endings
Visual novels
Windows games